Alexander Hair (9 March 1898 – 31 May 1970) was a Scottish footballer who played as a centre forward.

Career
Born in Glasgow and nicknamed 'Sandy', he joined Partick Thistle in 1923 from local Junior club Strathclyde, where he had become a prolific goalscorer. By that time he was 25 years of age, relatively old to join a senior club; however, many sources record his birth date as 9 March 1902, and contemporary documents also show a younger age than he truly was, suggesting the player himself may have been aware of this inaccuracy. After loan spells in lower divisions at Queen of the South, Third Lanark, Alloa Athletic and Bo'ness he established himself with the Jags, scoring 41 goals in 36 Scottish Football League appearances during the 1926–27 season (however, Jimmy McGrory of Celtic scored 48 to claim the top scorer award – neither Partick nor Celtic challenged for the league title), plus another five goals in a Glasgow Merchants Charity Cup final victory against Rangers at the end of that campaign.

Hair joined Preston North End for the 1928–29 season for a £2,200 transfer fee. He scored 19 goals in his first season at Deepdale, but lost his first team place and was placed on the 'open to transfer' list, meaning a new club within Britain would have to pay Preston's desired fee of £1000. After moving to Irish football where the regulation did not apply, in the 1930–31 season Hair set the record for most league goals scored by a Shelbourne player in one season with a tally of twenty-nine in just twenty-two matches. This prolific scoring helped Shelbourne win their third League of Ireland title.

Hair returned to Britain to play for Colwyn Bay United of the Birmingham and District League, and then served Worcester City as player-manager, Burton Town as a player and Shirley Town as manager. He later worked as an engineer in Scotland, including at Sir William Arrol & Co.

Honours
Partick Thistle
Glasgow Merchants Charity Cup: 1926–27

Individual
League of Ireland Top Scorer: 1930–31

References

Partick Thistle F.C. players
Preston North End F.C. players
Shelbourne F.C. players
League of Ireland players
Scottish expatriate sportspeople in Ireland
Expatriate association footballers in the Republic of Ireland
Scottish expatriate footballers
Worcester City F.C. players
Worcester City F.C. managers
1898 births
1970 deaths
Footballers from Glasgow
People from Bridgeton, Glasgow
Scottish footballers
Colwyn Bay F.C. players
Strathclyde F.C. players
Queen of the South F.C. players
Third Lanark A.C. players
Alloa Athletic F.C. players
Bo'ness F.C. players
Scottish football managers
Association football player-managers
Association football forwards
Scottish Football League players
Scottish Junior Football Association players
Burton Town F.C. players